Perry Townsend is an American composer and pianist based in New York City. Townsend's debut CD, No Suggestion of Silence, released in August 2001 by Capstone Records, contains choral, piano, and orchestral pieces.
Growing up in Raleigh, North Carolina he began composing at a young age and sang for many years in the Raleigh Boy Choir directed by Thomas Sibley.

References

Living people
American male composers
21st-century American composers
American male conductors (music)
21st-century American conductors (music)
21st-century American male musicians
Year of birth missing (living people)